"If You Go Down to the Woods" is an episode of the BBC sitcom, The Green Green Grass. It was first screened on 23 November 2007, as the third episode of series three.

Synopsis

Marlene is distraught when Earl the dog and Tyler both go missing. Boycie, Bryan and Jed form a search party, but entering the haunted woods with night drawing in soon confounds the rescuers causing them a wet, cold and miserable nights sleep on the woodland floor. Meanwhile, Tyler and Beth progress with their relationship.

Episode cast

References

British TV Comedy Guide for The Green Green Grass
BARB viewing figures

2007 British television episodes
The Green Green Grass episodes